Dinesh Kanabar is an entrepreneur and international tax expert. He is founder and CEO of Dhruva Advisors, one of the largest tax and regulatory boutiques in India that has been consistently rated as India Tax Firm of the year over the years. Prior to founding Dhruva, Dinesh held various positions, including Deputy CEO of KPMG in India and Deputy CEO of RSM.Dinesh works closely with some of the largest multi-national corporations and Indian business houses advising on business, tax and regulatory matters. He has worked on some of the largest mergers and acquisitions, corporate restructuring and tax litigation engagements in the country. He also works very closely with the Government of India on Tax Policy matters.  Dinesh has been recognized as Asia Tax Practice Leader of the Year-2020 by International Tax Review, and he regularly pens articles on a variety of subjects ranging from tax to leadership.

Early career
Dinesh Kanabar started his career in the 1980s as a partner in a tax advisory boutique RSM & Co., which thereafter merged with PwC, a Big Four accounting firm. He continued as the Head of Tax and Regulatory practice of PwC India.

In 2010, Dinesh Kanabar joined KPMG as its Deputy CEO, where he was responsible for the Tax Advisory and Markets practices.In this role, he worked on some of the largest tax litigations (Vodafone) and largest cross border transactions, and did some pioneering work on resolving cross-border disputes through competent authority proceedings.

Dhruva Advisors
In 2014, Dinesh founded Dhruva Advisors, a boutique full-service Tax and Regulatory firm which focuses on Tax Advocacy, Tax Litigation, Mergers & Acquisitions, etc.Dhruva Advisors has been recognized as one of the fastest-growing practices in the country, and by August 2017, it grew to eight offices, four in India and one each in Singapore and United Arab Emirates. Dhruva Advisors employs about 300 people and has 16 partners. Euromoney named Dhruva Advisors as the Indian Tax Firm of the Year in 2017, 2018, 2019, 2020 & 2021 making it the first firm with the rare feat of getting the award for five years in a row. International Tax Review also recognised Dhruva Advisors as  India Tax Disputes Firm of the Year 2020 by ITR's Asia Tax Awards, 2020. 

Dinesh has worked with the Government of India on several committees to help promote foreign investment in India, tax reforms, and the like. He is a member of the Body of Trade formed by Ministry of Commerce and Industry. He has engaged in ongoing consultations with the Government on the implementation of the Goods and Services Tax.

Dinesh serves as Independent Director on the Board of Jio Platforms Limited, the largest telecom service provider in India, and on Adani Green Energy Limited, the largest green energy company in India. Dinesh is also a Member of the Governing Council of Shiv Nadar University.

Memberships
Dinesh is a fellow member of the Institute of Chartered Accountants of India. He is a member of the National Executive Committee of FICCI (Federation of Indian Chambers of Commerce & Industry) and is currently a mentor of the FICCI Committee on Taxation.

Personal life
Dinesh is an avid philatelist.

References

External links 
Dhruva Advisors website

Living people
Indian chief executives
Indian accountants
Indian philatelists
Year of birth missing (living people)